Walter Humphries Montague,  (November 21, 1858 – November 14, 1915) was a Canadian politician.  He was a federal cabinet minister in the governments of Mackenzie Bowell and Charles Tupper, and subsequently a provincial cabinet minister in the Manitoba government of Rodmond Roblin.  Montague was a member of the Conservative Party of Canada.

Biography
Montague was born in Adelaide, in Middlesex County, Canada West (now Ontario),  the son of Joseph Montague. He was educated at Woodstock College and the Toronto School of Medicine, and received a medical degree from Victoria University in 1882. He practised medicine in Dunnville, Ontario and later at the General Hospital in Hamilton. He married Angie Furey. Montague was a member of the College of Physicians and Surgeons of Ontario, and a licentiate of the Royal College of Physicians in Edinburgh, Scotland.

He campaigned for the Legislative Assembly of Ontario as a candidate of the provincial Conservative Party in the provincial election of 1883, but lost to Liberal candidate Richard Harcourt by 129 votes in the constituency of Monck.  He campaigned for the House of Commons of Canada in the 1887 federal election, and defeated Liberal incumbent Charles Wesley Colter by a single vote in the riding of Haldimand, 1,746 to 1,745.  The Conservatives won this election, and Montague served as a backbench supporter of John A. Macdonald's government.

Elections were frequently challenged in this period of Canadian history, and Montague's one-vote victory did not stand official scrutiny.  His victory was nullified on October 15, 1887, and a new election was called for the riding on November 12.  Montague this time defeated Colter by seventeen votes, and returned to the Commons.  The Liberals once again challenged the result, and the second election was voided by the Supreme Court of Canada on December 14, 1888.  A third election was called for January 30, 1889, which Colter won by forty-six votes.

Colter's victory, however, proved no more solid than Montague's had been.  The Conservatives challenged the result of the third election, and its results were set aside on January 22, 1890.  A fourth election was called for February 20, 1890, and Montague was again declared elected.  He was also returned in the 1891 federal election, defeating Colter by the more convincing margin of seventy-eight votes.  This time, the result was not overturned.

The Conservatives won the 1891 election, and Montague continued to serve as a government backbencher.  He was promoted to cabinet by Prime Minister Mackenzie Bowell on December 21, 1894 as a Minister without portfolio.  On March 26, 1895, he was further promoted to Secretary of State of Canada.  He held this position until December 21, 1895, when he was named as Canada's Minister of Agriculture.

Montague resigned from cabinet on January 5, 1896, to protest against Bowell's inaction on the Manitoba Schools Question.  He was part of the group of ministers famously described by Bowell as a "nest of traitors".  After the issue was resolved, he returned to cabinet on January 15.  He was retained in the Agriculture portfolio when Charles Tupper replaced Bowell as Prime Minister on May 1, 1896.

Montague was easily re-elected in the 1896 federal election in the redistributed riding of Haldimand and Monck.  The Conservatives were defeated by Wilfrid Laurier's Liberals, however, and Montague served as an opposition member in the parliamentary that followed.  He lost his seat to Andrew Thorburn Thompson by 137 votes in the 1900 election.

He returned to his medical practice after his defeat, and moved to Winnipeg, Manitoba in 1908.  He returned to political life on November 4, 1913, when he was appointed as Minister of Public Works in Rodmond Roblin's provincial Conservative government.  He did not hold a seat in the Legislative Assembly of Manitoba at the time, so a by-election was called in Kildonan and St. Andrews for November 29, 1913.

This by-election was extremely bitter and divisive.  The opposition aggressively attacked Montague's personal life and political record, while the Conservative electoral machine had over 40 cars working the constituency on polling day.  Montague was elected, defeating Liberal candidate A.N. Bredin by 370 votes.  He was re-elected in the 1914 provincial election by a single vote.

The Rodmond government was forced to resign in 1915, after a commission of enquiry called by the Lieutenant Governor found the government guilty of corruption in the tendering of contracts for new legislative buildings.  The administration resigned on May 12, 1915, and new elections were called.  Montague was not a candidate, and the Liberals won the election in a landslide.

Montague was inducted on fraud charges for his part in the contracts scandal, but died in Winnipeg before legal proceedings could begin.

His son Percival John Montague was a general and judge.

References

1858 births
1915 deaths
Conservative Party of Canada (1867–1942) MPs
Members of the House of Commons of Canada from Ontario
Progressive Conservative Party of Manitoba MLAs
Physicians from Manitoba
Members of the King's Privy Council for Canada
Members of the Executive Council of Manitoba